Herbert Road in Ballsbridge, Ireland is a mostly residential road that links Tritonville Road with Lansdowne Road. Newbridge Avenue joins by the bridge, in front of Marian College and the former site of Sandymount High School next door. There are several hotels on the road. Noteworthy is the Mount Herbert Hotel which is a conversion of a terrace of stately homes. The road extends to the roundabout at the junction, which is part of Lansdowne Road. Both this road, and Newbridge Avenue, are built on the former site of Haigs' distillery.

The house at 14 Herbert Road sold for €2.41m in February 2004, setting a record price for a house on this road.

See also

List of streets and squares in Dublin

References

 

Streets in Dublin (city)
Sandymount
Ballsbridge